Ashtabula Township may refer to the following townships in the United States:

 Ashtabula Township, Barnes County, North Dakota
 Ashtabula Township, Ashtabula County, Ohio